Girolamo Buonvisi (1607–1677) was a Roman Catholic Cardinal.

Biography
On 30 Jul 1651, he was consecrated bishop by Marcantonio Franciotti, Cardinal-Priest of Santa Maria della Pace, with Giambattista Spada, Titular Patriarch of Constantinople, and Carlo Carafa della Spina, Bishop of Aversa, serving as co-consecrators.

Episcopal succession
While bishop, he was the principal co-consecrator of:
Giacomo Giordano, Bishop of Lacedonia (1651);
Gabriel Ortiz de Orbé, Bishop of Gaeta (1651); and
Alessandro Argoli, Bishop of Veroli (1651).

References

1607 births
1677 deaths
17th-century Italian cardinals
Cardinals created by Pope Alexander VII